Timo Tapio Grönlund (6 January 1954 – 27 December 2022) was a Finnish sprint canoer who competed from the mid-1970s to the late 1980s. Competing in four Summer Olympics, he earned his best finish of fourth in the C-1 1000 m event at Los Angeles in 1984.

References

 Sports-reference.com profile

1954 births
2022 deaths
Canoeists from Tampere
Canoeists at the 1976 Summer Olympics
Canoeists at the 1980 Summer Olympics
Canoeists at the 1984 Summer Olympics
Canoeists at the 1988 Summer Olympics
Finnish male canoeists
Olympic canoeists of Finland